Pinamalayan, officially the Municipality of Pinamalayan,  is a 1st class municipality in the province of Oriental Mindoro, Philippines. According to the 2020 census, it has a population of 90,383 people.

History 
The town of Pinamalayan is one of the oldest in the province of Oriental Mindoro. Its territory once went as far as the old settlements of Sumagui and Anilao which are now part of the towns Bansud and Bongabong respectively. The Town of Pinamalayan was also a former part of Pola until it got its permanent township status in the early years of American Colonization while Gloria was separated from Pinamalayan in 1964.

Legend of town's origin
The town of Pinamalayan is close to the shore at the mouth of the river of the same name. The town's name was said to be taken from the word “Ipinamalay na” which means to make aware or to show the way or it has been made known to us. According to an old story, the early settlers of this town came from Marinduque. While they were on their way to Mindoro in their big bancas (boats), they encountered turbulent weather and lost their way. They prayed to the God Almighty for deliverance and guidance, whereupon, the weather cleared and a rainbow appeared on the horizon, and guided them towards safety and to a place where they discovered abundant resources and endless promises. The crew shouted “ipinamalay na” (it was made known).

They followed the direction of the rainbow believing that at its en lies a pot of gold and good fortune. They finally landed at what is now Barangay Lumambayan and established the first settlement which they named Pinamalayan. They found good fortune in the new land which brought them prosperity because of the good soil and abundant resources.

Some other sources attribute the name Pinamalayan simply to the fact that the area was once a vast area planted to rice, hence the name “pinagpalayan” or “Pinamalayan”. Since then the place grew and became a town. However, during the entire 18th century, Pinamalayan was one of the coastal areas frequently attacked by Moro Pirates. People were decimated and many field to the interior for safety. In spite of all these, the town site remained in that place until 1916 when it was transferred by the Americans to its present site.

Spanish period
The history of the town has its ancient beginning antedating far back with the advent of the Marinduque settlers in the early part of the 18th century who landed on the shores of the old settlement at Lumang-bayan. The first village was implanted there by the newcomers pushing back the pagans into the interior. In the course of time and subjected by the ravages of Moro piracy, the natives had to fight back the buccaneers as well as the tulisanes at the end of the 19th century. The old Lumang-bayan was the town up to its transfer to the present site on or about 1914. The Recollect Order first established a part of the second ecclesiastic district of Naujan and extend as far as Bongabon, assigning St. Agustine as its titular (Patron Saint).

The pattern of this town's territorial expansion dated back during the Spanish time when the villagers of Pinamalayan, Pola, Sumagui, Anilao and Bongabon belonged to one ministry district. That pattern was closely adhered to in the later part of the Spanish regime from 1888 to 1890. It was organized as a permanent settlement with Juan Morente, Sr. as gobernadorcillo and succeeded by his son, Juan Morente, Jr., as Captain (Mayor) in 1890–1894. When the revolution broke out against Spain, Pinamalayan took up arms and underwent some government changes under the provisional Malolos government headed by Juan Medina in 1898. When the Spaniards surrendered, Morente Jr. became governor of the province of Mindoro while Cornelio Nable was appointed as the municipal president.

American period

In the Filipino-American War, the American forces took possession of the town, placed it under a military regime from 1901 to 1902; appointed Cornelio Nable as its first President under the new civil government. Reorganized on April 28, 1904, under Act No. 1135 of the Philippine Commission, the municipalities of Bongabon and Pola were annexed to Pinamalayan as barrios. In the following year, on January 4, 1905, under Act No. 1280, the municipality of Pola was annexed to Pinamalayan as a barrio. In 1914, Pinamalayan was organized as a regular municipality. Since then, a new town site has been proposed, selected and surveyed for expansion. This new town site was planned by Governor Juan Morente, Jr. and Mr. Thomas I. Weeks. The American planners made sure that this new town will be laid out properly according to a planning system of wide symmetrical vertical and horizontal roads with proper drainage facilities. A big plaza was further constructed in front of the municipal building. Pinamalayan still stands as a model in town planning to all the municipalities in Oriental Mindoro.

In 1914 to 1916, during these years under review, the national high way to Pinamalayan has also been proposed and completed in 1931.

In January 1912, Pola was separated from Pinamalayan as township and in 1920, Bongabon was separated from Pinamalayan as a municipal district under Act No. 2824 of March 15, 1919. Agriculture and business developments gradually increased with opening of roads. More people immigrated since then; this position of publics land has hastened; homesteading increased and greater areas of uncultivated lands were turned to production.

Japanese period
On or about January 20, 1942, the Japanese Army from Calapan occupied the town and appointed Carlos Aguilocho and M. Medina as occupation Mayors. On or about January 15, 1945, the American Army from San Jose landed at Pinamalayan and liberated it from the enemy. Substantial progress has been made in the rehabilitation of the town since 1946. Municipal roads were repaired and extended, three big bridges were constructed (Balete, Nabuslot, and Lumambayan), a water system and a new market were constructed, a puericulture center and the beautification of the town plaza were undertaken. In 1948, Quinabigan was declared a national sub-port. The town is composed of six big barrios, namely; Lumang-bayan, Quinabigan, Nabuslot, Panggulayan, Maligaya, and Balete.

Typhoon Melor

On December 15, 2015, Pinamalayan is hit by Typhoon Nona (Melor), which made its fifth landfall. The town is badly damaged by the typhoon, with 15,000 homes devastated, about 83% of the 18,000 houses destroyed in Oriental Mindoro, and 24,000 families evacuated.

Geography
The town of Ipinamalay (now Pinamalayan) is close to the shore on the river of the same name about 2-3/4 miles- south-westward of Bugot Point. The Pinamalayan River whose source originates from the mountains north of the town empties at the mouth of the old Lumang-Bayan River. Stretching from Mount Dumali in the north-eastern part of the island high and prominent, the coastal trends southward with a succession of sweeping curves towards Pinamalayan Bay to Duyagan Point.

The town is bounded on the north by Babahurin Hill and extends towards the north-west which meets the town of Pola. Towards the south and north, the town lies on an extensive plain and is low and flat towards the south direction to Balete and up to the boundary of Bongabon. About 90% of its area is located on its level plain which extends into the interior. It is intersected by three rivers, namely; the Lumangbayan, the Balete and the Pula Rivers which are short and never navigable. The town is exposed to the north-east monsoon, but with the mountain facing north, it is safe from that direction.

Climate

Barangays 
Pinamalayan is politically subdivided into 37 Barangays.

Demographics

The town's population is mostly Mangyan and Tagalog.

Economy

Pinamalayan is one of the ranking producers of coconuts in the Philippines. Its fertile plains are also devoted to yearly rice production making it a source of supply for Marinduque, Tablas, and neighboring localities. The municipality is one of the premier producers of bananas, a variety of forest products are gathered; a diversification of crops, vegetables and fruit trees are being accomplished.

It accounts for a variety of fish products from the sea; some fish ponds are now being developed; ranked second to none in the manufacture of wooden shoes, a distributing center of retail and wholesale trade for Sibale and Bongabon, it has a busy market in the poblacion and a barrio market at Nabuslot. It is not only a coconut region, but it is also a retail and wholesale trade center. It stands with 5 drug stores, 74 dry goods stores, 2 jewelry and repair shops, 4 bars, and refreshment parlors, 4 barber shops, 3 furniture houses, 5 restaurants, 2 gasoline stations, 4 tailor shops, 4 bakeries, 4 photographers, 20 Chinese stores, 5 lumber and hardware dealers, 5 cockpits, 2 contractors, a PRISCO store, 16 copra dealers, 3 wooden shoe factories, 1 theatre, 36 public market stall holders, 17 fishermen, and 46 tuba dealers.

Pinamalayan's semi-circular waterfront affords excellent anchorage for vessels of inter-island type and visited weekly by steamers direct from Manila via Marinduque. It also affords an anchorage for ocean-going vessels in the sub-port of Quinabigan where copra is shipped every three months. It stands mid-way in the national high way to Bongabon and to Calapan. The Borbon and Halcon buses make this town a terminal and transport system. In the field of communication service, it has postal and telegraphic services, serving a wide area of 21,000 souls. It boasts also of its 2 light houses, one at Punta Dumali and other in town proper.

Pinamalayan in its bid to become the premier financial and educational destinations in the Southern part of Oriental Mindoro saw the emergence of national business establishing their branch on this municipality. Recently, Jollibee, Chowking and Red Ribbon established its branch in Barangay Marfrancisco on the area more popularly called Triangle near Abada College. Some of the more popular franchises such as Potato Corner and Siomai House are also located in this town.

ATM service is also available in this town with the emergence of major banks such as Metrobank, Landbank of the Philippines and Philippine National Bank among others.

There are two branches of Mercury Drug on this town complementing the medical requirements of the town's constituents.

Heritage
Pinamalayan has a number of ancestral houses which are now mostly used for business purposes.

San Agustin Ancestral House
Located along Burgos St. corner Mabini St., San Agustin Ancestral House was built in 1922. Wide plank hardwood flooring is maintained in the second floor which now houses an internet café.

List of Cultural Properties in Pinamalayan

|}

Tourism

Health Care
Pinamalayan is home to several Infirmary and Level I Hospitals accredited by the Department of Health. As of the latest DOH Facility Registry, there are 44 health care facilities in the municipality as follows:

 Level I - two hospitals
 Oriental Mindoro Central District Hospital
 Pinamalayan Doctors' Hospital
 Infirmary - two health facilities
 Delos Reyes Medical Clinic
 St. Paul General Hospital
 Rural Health Unit - one unit
 Pinamalayan Rural Health Unit
 Birthing Home - one facility
 Vertucio Medical Clinic
 General Clinic and Laboratory - one facility
 Barretto Medical and Diagnostic Center
 Barangay Health Station - thirty-seven (37) facilities

LEVEL I HOSPITALS 
LEVEL I Hospitals are general hospitals that offer out-patient, in-patient, and emergency services as well as the following functions accredited by the Department of Health: operating room, recovery room, labor and delivery facilities, isolation units, clinical laboratory, imaging facility, and a pharmacy.

ORIENTAL MINDORO CENTRAL DISTRICT HOSPITAL (OMCDH) 
Previously known as Pinamalayan Community Hospital, is a government-owned hospital that aims to provide free health care services for the constituents of the municipality. It is one of the two Level I government hospitals in the second district of Oriental Mindoro, the other one being Oriental Mindoro Southern District Hospital. It is located at Strong Republic Nautical High Way, Brgy. Papandayan, Pinamalayan, Oriental Mindoro.

PINAMALAYAN DOCTORS' HOSPITAL (PDH) 
Located at the heart of Pinamalayan is Pinamalayan Doctors' Hospital, more known to the locals as Ospital ni Dr. Ng. It is a 30-bed capacity private hospital and the only DOH accredited private Level I Hospital in the second district of Oriental Mindoro. It offers general medical services such as General Medicine, Internal Medicine (Adult Diseases), General Pediatrics, General Surgery, and Obstetrics and Gynecology. Specialized services such as ENT-Head and Neck Surgery, Cardiology, Endocrinology, Gastroenterology, Nephrology, Orthopedic Surgery, and Laparoscopic Surgery are also available.

Ancillary services include x-ray, ultrasound, 2D-Echo, clinical laboratory, and hospital pharmacy. The Emergency Room is open 24 hours a day, seven days a week.

PDH is located at Francisco St., Brgy Marfrancisco, Pinamalayan, Oriental Mindoro.

INFIRMARY FACILITIES 
Infirmary facilities are facilities approved by the Department of Health to render minimal to intermediate care and management in the following areas: Medicine, Pediatrics, Non-surgical Obstetrics and Gynecology, Minor Surgery.

DELOS REYES MEDICAL CLINIC 
One of the earliest medical facilities in the municipality, Delos Reyes Medical Clinic is located at Aguinaldo St., Pinamalayan, Oriental Mindoro.

ST. PAUL GENERAL HOSPITAL 
Known as a children's hospital, St. Paul General Hospital now caters to adult patients as well. Located at Quezon St., Brgy Zone III, Pinamalayan, Oriental Mindoro.

RURAL HEALTH UNIT (RHU) 
Pinamalayan Rural Health Unit is also known as the Municipal Health Office of Pinamalayan. It is Headed by Dr. Niña Kristinne L. Punzalan (Municipal Health Officer) with Dr. Marc Jayson Castro (Rural Health Physician), and Dr. Kathrin Alano Castro (Medical Officer III). They, along with the rest of the Municipal Health Office Staff, conduct regular public health programs and services to the constituents of Pinamalayan. Their efforts have permitted them to bring health care services to the far-flung areas of the municipality and the underserved communities.

Education

Tertiary

Secondary

Elementary

Private schools:
 ABADA College Elementary Department
 Montessori Progressive Preschool
 Montessori Progressive Grade School
 Maria Loreto Integrated School Foundation Inc. (MLISFI)
 Pinamalayan Anglo School (PAS)
 Pinamalayan Adventist Elementary School (PAES)
 Ema Emits College Philippines (formerly EMITS) Elementary Department
 Metamorphosis Child Development and Care Center (MCDCC)

Pinamalayan West District
Pinamalayan East District

Public Schools:
 Banilad Elementary School
 Buli Elementary School
 Dona Asuncion Reyes Memorial Elementary School
 Juan Morente Senior Memorial Pilot School
 Lumambayan Elementary School
 Malaya Elementary School
 Natividad De Joya Elementary School
 Papandayan Elementary School
 Pili Elementary School
 Quinabigan Elementary School
 Ranzo Elementary School
 Rosario Elementary School
 Santa Isabel Elementary School
 Upper Bongol Elementary School
 Cacawan Elementary School
 Wawa Elementary School

Public Schools:
 Anoling Elementary School
 Bacungan Elementary School
 Bangbang Elementary School
 Calingag Elementary School
 Inclanay Elementary School
 Maliancog Elementary School
 Maningcol Elementary School
 Marayos Elementary School
 Miguel Ansaldo Sr. Memorial Elementary School (MASMES)
 Nabuslot Central School
 Pagalagala Elementary School
 Pambisan Munti Elementary School
 Panggulayan Elementary School
 Sabang Elementary School
 Safa Elementary School
 Santa Rita Elementary School

References

External links
 Pinamalayan Profile at PhilAtlas.com
 
Pinamalayan News Online
 [ Philippine Standard Geographic Code]
Philippine Census Information
Local Governance Performance Management System

Municipalities of Oriental Mindoro